Kolbotn IL Handball is a sub-section under Kolbotn IL, one of the largest sports clubs in Norway.  The club started handball in 1940 and organized Handball as a semi-autonomous sub-section in 1960.

Achievements

Handball, Men
The men's team played in the National League for 13 years between 1975 and 1988.
 1983 National League, winner
 1984 National League, winner
 1985 National League, runner up

Notable Athletes
Runar Bauer
Vidar Bauer
Gunnar Fosseng

See also
 Kolbotn Fotball
 Kolbotn Wrestling

Norwegian handball clubs
Sport in Akershus